The enzyme phenylacetyl-CoA hydrolase (EC 3.1.2.25) catalyzes the reaction

phenylglyoxylyl-CoA + H2O  phenylglyoxylate + CoA

This enzyme belongs to the family of hydrolases, specifically those acting on thioester bonds.  The systematic name of this enzyme class is phenylglyoxylyl-CoA hydrolase.

References

 
 

EC 3.1.2
Enzymes of unknown structure